is a railway station on the Hakodate Main Line in Kutchan, Hokkaido, Hokkaido, Japan. It is operated by JR Hokkaido and has the station number "S24".

Lines
Both local and the Rapid Niseko Liner services stop at the station.

Station layout
The station consists of a side platform serving a single track.

Platforms

History
After the Hokkaido Railway was nationalized on 1 July 1907, Japanese Government Railways (JGR) took over control of the station. On 12 October 1909 the station became part of the Hakodate Main Line. On 1 April 1987, with the privatization of Japanese National Railways (JNR), the successor of JGR, control of the station passed to JR Hokkaido.

See also
 List of railway stations in Japan

References

External links

 Hirafu station information 

Railway stations in Hokkaido Prefecture
Stations of Hokkaido Railway Company
Railway stations in Japan opened in 1904